Baskog Radyo 102.5 (DYOP 102.5 MHz) is an FM station owned and operated by Sarraga Integrated and Management Corporation. Its studios and transmitter are located at Capiz Government and Business Center, Roxas, Capiz.

Last February 6, the station went off the air after the government of Capiz dismantled its antenna. The provincial government clarified that the station has issues with the antenna, stating that it is a threat to public safety that had to be transferred.

References

External links
Baskog Radyo FB Page

Radio stations in Capiz
Radio stations established in 2018